Daphne Martschenko (born in London, November 6, 1992) is an American student athlete and academic. She attended Oakton High School in Fairfax, Virginia, joining the crew team her freshman year. She later attended Stanford University, majoring in Slavic languages and anthropology. While at Stanford, she earned two gold medals, one in the NCAA Division I Rowing Championship. She represented the United States at two World Rowing U23 Championships. In 2014, she enrolled at the University of Cambridge where she obtained a PhD focusing on the impact of behavioral genetics on the education system.  While at Cambridge, she competed in the Oxford-Cambridge Boat Race and was elected president of the Cambridge University Women's Boat Club for the 2018 boat race campaign. She is currently an assistant professor at the Stanford Center for Biomedical Ethics.

Early life
Martschenko was born in London to Alex, a U.S. foreign service officer of Ukrainian heritage, and Oluwatoyin ("Toyin"), originally from Nigeria. She has three sisters and lived in Kyrgyzstan, Russia, and Ukraine while young.

References

External links

1992 births
American female rowers
Living people
Stanford Cardinal women's rowers
Alumni of the University of Cambridge
Sportspeople from Fairfax, Virginia
American people of Ukrainian descent
American sportspeople of Nigerian descent
Oakton High School alumni